Motiullah Khan, alternatively spelled Mutiullah Khan (31 January 1938 – 12 August 2022), was a Pakistani field hockey player. He won gold medal in 1960 Summer Olympics and silver medals in 1956 and 1964 Summer Olympics. He also received Tamgha-i-Imtiaz award from Government of Pakistan in 1963. The International Hockey Stadium in Bahawalpur (Motiullah Hockey Stadium) is named after him. He played over 68 international matches and scored 13 goals for his country.

Samiullah Khan and Kaleemullah Khan, the famous Olympic hockey players, are both his relatives.

References

External links
 

1938 births
2022 deaths
Pakistani male field hockey players
Olympic field hockey players of Pakistan
Olympic gold medalists for Pakistan
Olympic silver medalists for Pakistan
Olympic medalists in field hockey
Medalists at the 1956 Summer Olympics
Medalists at the 1960 Summer Olympics
Medalists at the 1964 Summer Olympics
Field hockey players at the 1956 Summer Olympics
Field hockey players at the 1960 Summer Olympics
Field hockey players at the 1964 Summer Olympics
Asian Games medalists in field hockey
Field hockey players at the 1958 Asian Games
Field hockey players at the 1962 Asian Games
Field hockey players from Bahawalpur
Asian Games gold medalists for Pakistan
Medalists at the 1962 Asian Games
Medalists at the 1958 Asian Games
20th-century Pakistani people
21st-century Pakistani people